The Keystone XO-15 was an American prototype observation aircraft, built by the Keystone Aircraft Corporation for the United States Army Air Corps, First flown in 1930, only a single prototype was built.

Specifications (XO-15)

See also

References

O-015
1930s United States military reconnaissance aircraft
Single-engined tractor aircraft
Biplanes
Aircraft first flown in 1930